Zherebyatyevo is a rural locality (a village) in Satovoinskoye Rural Settlement, Velikoustyugsky District, Vologda Oblast, Russia. The population was 56 as of 2002.

Geography 
Zherebyatyevo is located 5 km west of Veliky Ustyug (the district's administrative centre) by road. Valga is the nearest rural locality.

References 

Rural localities in Velikoustyugsky District